The Michelle Apartments is a 1995 Canadian black comedy film directed by John Pozer and written by Ross Weber.

The film stars Henry Czerny as Alex Hartwell, a government auditor sent to the small town of Walton to review the books of a chemical company. When his hotel room is mistakenly given to another client, he is forced to take a room in the Michelle Apartments, where he is drawn into a romantic attraction to his neighbour Madeline (Mary Beth Rubens), whose husband Dean (Daniel Kash) is in prison. When Dean is released and comes home to find Madeline and Alex kissing, events spiral into a murderous chaos.

The cast also includes Peter Outerbridge, Nancy Beatty and Maria Vacratsis.

The film premiered at the 1995 Toronto International Film Festival.

Critical response
For The Globe and Mail, Rick Groen called the film a northern gothic spin on Something Wild, and wrote that "the menace pulls up considerably short of skin-crawling suspense, while the sex lacks any real steam (unless you count a mild flirtation in the laundry room). These gaps may well be deliberate - Pozer's idea of comic dissonance - but the yuks just aren't there." Jay Stone of the Ottawa Citizen lambasted the film, writing that "This is independent cinema at its worst: self-indulgent, incompetent, charmless, empty. Needless to say, taxpayers helped fund it through the Ontario Film Development Corp. and Telefilm Canada. If this is the best we can do, maybe it's time to pull the plug and let Disney take over altogether.

Peter Birnie of the Montreal Gazette reviewed the film more favourably, writing that "The Michelle Apartments is unnecessarily busy, especially in cafe scenes cute enough to bounce into a Bounty ad, but there's still strong impetus to Pozer's strange vision. Lynne Stopkewich designs a town of Orwellian disproportions, Peter Wunstorf photographs it all in shades of gaudy menace and Mark Korven's music makes this address arch enough to be fun."

Awards
The film received two Genie Award nominations at the 16th Genie Awards, for Best Sound Editing (Paul Shikata, Tim Roberts, Andy Malcolm, Paul Germann, Steven Munro) and Best Original Score (Korven).

References

External links
 

1995 films
1995 comedy films
1990s black comedy films
1990s Canadian films
1990s English-language films
Alliance Films films
Canadian black comedy films
English-language Canadian films
Films directed by John Pozer
Films scored by Mark Korven